Banankoro may refer to:

Banankoro, Beyla, a town in Guinea
Banankoro, Kérouané, a town in Guinea